Kirksey v. Kirksey,  Ala. Sup. 8 Ala. 131 (1845), was a case decided by the Supreme Court of Alabama that held that a promise by a man, Issac Kirksey  to give his sister-in-law a house if she would move to his land was not a valid contract because it lacked bargained-for-consideration.

The trial was initiated in Talladega, Alabama.

Background
The plaintiff Antillico Kirksey was a widow living in a lease-to-own home.  After learning of his brother and nephew's deaths, the defendant wrote the following letter to his sister-in-law Antillico:
Antillico relied on a promise from her brother-in-law and subsequently gave up her leased home. This home would become her opportunity cost when she moved into her brother-in-law's home.

Decision
After receiving the letter from her brother-in-law, the plaintiff moved to the defendant's farm, but the defendant kicked her out after two years, forcing her to live in a dilapidated house in the woods. 

Thus, the plaintiff sued to enforce the promise, but the court did not find a valid contract. It held that a promise on the condition, "[i]f you will come down and see me" is not a bargained for exchange for the promisee's "com[ing] down to see" the promisor. The promise is not sufficiently supported by bargained-for consideration and is not enforceable.

Justice John James Ormond issued a dissenting opinion in this case.

Legal analysis
Samuel Williston has opined that the plaintiff should have been allowed to invoke a promissory estoppel which allows plaintiffs to demand remedy for misleading promises. The idea of a "promissory estoppel" had not been fashioned at the time of the Kirksey holding which could have addressed the injustice experienced by the plaintiff. The injustice was based on detrimental reliance on a broken promise.

See also

Hoffman v. Red Owl Stores, Inc., 1965, Supreme Court of Wisconsin
700 F. 2d 916 - Vastoler v. American Can Company, 1983, United States Court of Appeals, Third Circuit

References

External links
Casto,W.R. & Ricks, V.D.  "Dear Sister Antillico": The story of Kirksey v. Kirksey, 94 Geo. L.J. 321, 383 (2006)

United States contract case law
1845 in United States case law
Alabama state case law
1845 in Alabama
Law articles needing an infobox